Blackberry Farm is a luxury resort in Walland, Tennessee, bordering the Great Smoky Mountains National Park. It was rated the best small hotel in America by Zagat Survey in 2004. Blackberry Farm is part of the Relais & Châteaux association.

History
Blackberry Farm was built by Florida and David Lasier in 1940 and opened in May 1941. In 1952, the Lasiers sold the property to the Jarvis family who subsequently sold it to Ruby Tuesday restaurant founder Sandy Beall and his wife Kreis. In 1990 they turned the property into a hotel, initially with six rooms. Their son Sam Beall spent his earliest years at Blackberry Farm and served as its owner until his death in 2016.

Property
The grounds cover , and the resort has 62 rooms. Blackberry Farm hosts culinary, musical and outdoor sporting activities and events on and off property. The property includes a timberframe barn from Pennsylvania, a dining and entertainment venue, a spa, an events hall, and guest cottages.

Popularity 
The resort is popular amongst celebrities. Maren Morris, Jesse Tyler Ferguson, Carrie Underwood, and couple Lily Aldridge and Caleb Followill have all reportedly stayed at Blackberry Farm. On April 23, 2022, golfer Dustin Johnson married Paulina Gretzky, daughter of Wayne Gretzky, on the property.

References

1976 establishments in Tennessee
Buildings and structures in Blount County, Tennessee
Hotels established in 1990
Hotels in Tennessee